Aladash is a rural locality (a selo) in Kurakhsky District, Republic of Dagestan, Russia. The population was 1,053 as of 2010. There are 21 streets.

Geography 
Aladash is located 84 km northeast of Kurakh (the district's administrative centre) by road. Rubas and Mollakent are the nearest rural localities.

Nationalities 
Lezgins live there.

References 

Rural localities in Kurakhsky District